Sodyshka is a rural locality (a settlement) in Novoalexandrovskoye Rural Settlement, Suzdalsky District, Vladimir Oblast, Russia. The population was 949 as of 2010. There are 3 streets.

Geography 
Sodyshka is located on the Rpen River, 36 km south of Suzdal (the district's administrative centre) by road. Krasnoye Sushchevo is the nearest rural locality.

References 

Rural localities in Suzdalsky District